The 2017–18 Formula 4 UAE Championship was the second season of the Formula 4 UAE Championship, a motor racing series for the United Arab Emirates regulated according to FIA Formula 4 regulations, and organised and promoted by the Automobile & Touring Club of the UAE (ATCUAE) and AUH Motorsports.

It began on 14 December 2017 at the Yas Marina Circuit and finished on 3 March 2018 at the Dubai Autodrome, after 24 championship races held across six quadruple-header rounds.

Teams and drivers

Race calendar and results
The calendar was announced on 5 September 2017. The season featured six quadruple-header rounds, all of them held at the Yas Marina Circuit in Abu Dhabi and the Dubai Autodrome in the United Arab Emirates. As opposed to the previous season, all rounds awarded points for the championship, the "Trophy Event" non-championship round not being held anymore.

Championship standings
Points were awarded to the top 10 classified finishers in each race.

Drivers' Championship

Teams' championship

Notes

References

External links
 F4 UAE Homepage

United Arab Emirates Formula 4 Championship
United Arab Emirates Formula 4 Championship
Formula 4 UAE Championship
Formula 4 UAE Championship
Formula 4 UAE Championship seasons
UAE F4
UAE F4